Magnus Cort Nielsen (born 16 January 1993) is a Danish professional road racing cyclist, who currently rides for UCI WorldTeam .

Career

Orica–GreenEDGE (2015–17)
In June 2014, World Tour team  signed Cort for three years, starting from the 2015 season. He was named in the startlist for the 2016 Vuelta a España, where he won stages 18 and 21.

Astana (2018–19)
He was named in the start list for the 2018 Tour de France. On 22 July 2018, Cort won stage 15 of the race after being in a breakaway for most of the day.

EF Education First (2020-present)
In August 2019, it was announced that Cort would be joining the  team on a two-year contract, from the 2020 season.

During the 2021 Vuelta a España he won three individual stages and was named the most combative rider of the race. He won the intermediate stage 6, where he just edged overall race leader Primož Roglič for the win. On stage 11 he dropped the surviving breakaway riders and was within less than 300 meters from his second stage win, but he was caught by Roglič, Enric Mas and other riders fighting for the general classification. The very next day Cort survived the two climbs and won his second stage of the Vuelta, crediting his team with setting him up perfectly for the sprint finish. On stage 19 Cort once again found himself at the front of the race near the end of the stage. With less than a kilometer to go his teammate Lawson Craddock rode at the front of the group to control the pace and put Cort in position to time his attack perfectly, which he then did defeating Rui Oliveira and Quinn Simmons in the sprint. Craddock came across the line five seconds later with his arms in the air celebrating the victory of his teammate.

At the start of the 2022 Tour de France he took every available mountain point, over the small hills of Denmark, to earn the polka dot jersey early in the race. After the rest day when the race moved to France, he broke the record of the great Federico Bahamontes, for finishing first at the most consecutive mountain checkpoints. On stage 5 the following day he once again joined the breakaway, with teammate Neilson Powless, who had a chance to take the yellow jersey. He fell slightly behind towards the end of the stage but won his second Most Combative Rider award in three stages. He lost the polka dot jersey after stage 9, but on stage 10 he joined the breakaway yet again; and survived to the finish where he won the eighth grand tour stage and second Tour de France stage of his career, in a photo finish. As the third week began he was forced to abandon the race due to a positive COVID test. As a result this became the first grand tour he ever entered that he did not finish.

Major results

2011
 1st  Road race, National Junior Road Championships
 1st  Overall Course de la Paix Juniors
1st Stages 3b & 4
 3rd Overall Kroz Istru
 8th Overall Trofeo Karlsberg
2012
 2nd Road race, National Under-23 Road Championships
 3rd Post Cup Odder
 3rd Tønder GP
2013
 Thüringen Rundfahrt der U23
1st  Mountains classification
1st Stage 6
 1st Stage 1 Tour de la Province de Liège
 3rd Ronde Van Vlaanderen Beloften
 3rd Himmerland Rundt
 9th Overall Danmark Rundt
1st Stages 1 & 4
 10th Hadeland GP
2014
 1st  Overall Ronde de l'Oise
1st  Points classification
1st  Young rider classification
1st Stages 3 & 4
 1st  Overall Istrian Spring Trophy
1st Stages 1 & 2
 1st Himmerland Rundt
 1st Destination Thy
 1st Ringerike GP
 1st Stage 1 Danmark Rundt
 2nd Overall Tour des Fjords
1st  Young rider classification
1st Stage 3
 5th Volta Limburg Classic
 6th Eschborn–Frankfurt City Loop U23
2015
 4th Road race, National Road Championships
 10th Overall Danmark Rundt
 10th GP Ouest–France
2016
 Vuelta a España
1st Stages 18 & 21
 2nd Overall Danmark Rundt
1st Stage 2
 4th Road race, National Road Championships
 5th Grand Prix Impanis-Van Petegem
 7th Grand Prix of Aargau Canton
 9th Gran Premio Bruno Beghelli
2017
 1st Clásica de Almería
 1st Stage 3 Volta a la Comunitat Valenciana
 2nd London–Surrey Classic
 10th Gran Premio Bruno Beghelli
2018
 1st Stage 15 Tour de France
 1st Stage 5 BinckBank Tour
 1st Stage 2 Tour de Yorkshire
 1st Stage 4 Tour of Oman
 2nd Overall Dubai Tour
1st  Young rider classification
 8th Milan–San Remo
2019
 1st  Mountains classification, Deutschland Tour
 1st Stage 4 Paris–Nice
2020
 Étoile de Bessèges
1st  Points classification
1st Stage 2
 1st Stage 16 Vuelta a España
2021
 Vuelta a España
1st Stages 6, 12 & 19
 Overall Combativity award
 1st Stage 8 Paris–Nice
 1st Stage 4 Route d'Occitanie
2022
 Tour de France
1st Stage 10
Held  after Stages 2–8
 Combativity award Stages 3 & 5
 1st Stage 1 O Gran Camiño
 2nd Time trial, National Road Championships
 5th Overall Danmark Rundt
 6th UCI World Gravel Championships
 6th Maryland Cycling Classic
 10th Coppa Bernocchi
2023
 7th Figueira Champions Classic
 9th Overall Volta ao Algarve
1st  Points classification
1st Stages 2 & 3

Grand Tour general classification results timeline

References

External links 

 CQ Ranking Profile
 

1993 births
Living people
People from Bornholm
Danish male cyclists
Cyclists at the 2010 Summer Youth Olympics
Danish Tour de France stage winners
Danish Vuelta a España stage winners
Sportspeople from the Capital Region of Denmark
20th-century Danish people
21st-century Danish people